The Royal Spanish Winter Sports Federation (Real Federación Española de Deportes de Invierno (RFEDI) in ) is the winter sports federation for Spain. Part of the Spanish Olympic Committee (COE), it deals with all federations conducting sports for the Winter Olympics. RFEDI is member of the International Ski Federation (FIS) and International Biathlon Union (IBU).

Disciplines
 Alpine skiing
 Nordic combined
 Cross-country skiing
 Ski jumping
 Freestyle skiing
 Snowboarding
 Biathlon

See also
Spanish Ice Sports Federation

External links
Official RFEDI website 

Spain
Winter sports
Spain
Skiing in Spain
Organisations based in Spain with royal patronage